Virtua Quest, known in Japan as , is a Virtua Fighter spin-off title co-developed by TOSE and Sega AM2, and published by Sega for the GameCube and PlayStation 2 video game consoles.

Plot

The world of Virtua Quest is one where many people shrug off reality, and instead spend their free time in the Nexus, a vast virtual universe. Sei is a cheerful guy who's been tapped by his friend, Hayami, into trying out the life of a hunter, one who collects data chips from the far-flung reaches of the Nexus and then sells them for cash. Sei, curious about the occupation, yet slightly intimidated by the dangers involved, reluctantly accepts after a bit of influence from Hayami, and the thought about the bike that they are trying to finish in time for the race in the real world.
After completing the Hunter's test and a brief explanation from Hayami about the Hunter's License rankings (LoA, HiA, and ExA), Sei finds the server address for Curio City, and makes his way to the location.

Right after he had just arrived, a strange creature named Bit appears from his Hunter's Glove in a blaze of light and announces that he will be his navigator throughout the servers he visits. Sei is fine with this, now that Bit had explained his startling entrance, but not with the fighters that pursue him a few minutes afterward. Then a girl with aqua-colored hair approaches him and directs him to log out. Sei demands that Bit log out, but the command is not accessible.

The girl then tells him to go to a warehouse and find what he needs there, and tells him that he's "in this fight, no matter what. The only person that can defend you is yourself." She also tells him to head to a building, and that the root user, the one preventing his logout, is there. She informs him that defeating the root user will let him logout. She then disappears.

Sei heads to the warehouse, and falls through the glass ceiling. He meets a man that bears a vague resemblance to his father, and tells him that he may need to fight, questioning whether he considers to fight for himself or for others. Sei answers a baffled reply to this, and as to rid his anxiety, the man teaches him Sypnapse Break, a special technique. Once taught this, Sei is confident, and starts his Hunter journey.

As Sei makes his way through the server, he collects Virtua Souls and fights more attackers, eventually making it all the way through them and encountering the root user. At the top of the building, he comes across a blonde African American in a load of armor. Despite his buff appearance, Sei easily defeated the root user, thus granting him the opportunity to log out, as well as the other hunters.

Back at the Hunter's Guild, Sei finds Hayami, and asks him about Virtua Souls. Hayami tells him that they are like "ghost data", meaning that they're to the point that they don't exist. Finding this information useless, he asks the shopkeeper, and when her explanation isn't any help, he asks a man talking to his sister, and finally he reveals information: A man was rousing him for Virtua Souls, and he vanished in the Wild Corridor, yet another lost server. Sei gains the server address to the Wild Corridor, and he too vanishes in the location.

Arriving at Wild Corridor, Sei discovers that he cannot log out (again). He is dismayed, but accepts his situation. As he makes his way through Wild Corridor, he spies another Hunter who also appears to have Synapse Break. Sei is bewildered by this, but doesn't comment further. As he continues to make his way, gathering Virtual Souls as he goes, he eventually finds the three root users, who appear to be triplets, and defeats them.

The game continues on where Sei finds out more about Toka and Toka knows about the syndicate and actually knows more about Judgement Six and one of the leaders Moon is collecting Data from fighters in order to create Durals through fighting abilities in order to conquer the world.  As the game progresses, Sei again meets a man who happens to be a Hunter with an ability that's far greater than Sei's and is also able to use Synapse Break. He finds out he's investigating something and is looking for some "Backup Data". He later finds out that Toka formerly worked for Judgement Six in which Toka explains is true and takes off crying. Later in the game the mysterious man explains more to Sei, that he investigated a group by the name of Judgement Six and he had a partner by the name of Raud who was killed by Judgement Six. Moon later came and divulged the mysterious man's name (Schatt). Schatt told Sei to leave and decided to fight Moon and his group alone. 

Later in the game Sei became discouraged and came across Hayami again with the girl by the name of Fei and finds out that her brother Fan has been logging in to other servers just to find out he could log out. Later Sei is told in order to get into the server, he had to expand his level to HiA.

After Sei completes his "Advanced Hunter's Test", Sei's able to log into a much higher server, "Thai Phong Ruins".

After the game progresses a little more, Sei rescues Fan's brother Fei just as he is informed by Hayami that more kidnappers have been seen on Dong Qian Jie server. As Sei goes there he spots strong enemies and a specially made Bit. The special Bit kidnapped Bit. As Sei chased him down and rescue Bit and goes down the server stage a little further, Sei came across Toka only to find out she was interrogated by Moon the leader of Judgement Six. Sei tried to stop Moon but was stopped by a special made Schatt. Sei  is punched to the ground. Moon escaped with Toka. Schatt also escaped only to find out Sei is once again surrounded by more enemies. As the game progresses, Sei comes across Schatt once again and notices Schatt also has the power to use Virtua Souls (the one he uses is Lau Chan's). The two had a showdown. He defeated Schatt only to found out the real Schatt was possessed by Moon earlier in the game which he'd lost to Moon. Schatt forcibly logged off (which is supposed to be a Virtua was of death in the Virtua Quest game) just to found out after Sei logged off. He was informed once again that Judgement Six is full-on invading multiple servers leading to the final battle. Sei uses Virtua Soul and fought Lau Chan from the Virtua Soul he gained from Schatt earlier during the fight with Schatt.

Reception

Virtua Quest received mixed reviews upon release. IGN said "The action is mediocre at best, and the platform elements feel sloppy and unrefined. The graphics and sound are equally forgetful." Play said it had "stiff controls, an antiquated camera with no look button". GameSpot said "The action is plagued by loose controls and a bad camera, your scores of brain-dead opponents never put up enough of a fight to make things satisfying, and it's all set in a blandly designed world." 1Up said "The derivative nature of the plot goes hand-in-hand with the completely unimaginative gameplay. Nothing here is original."

References

External links
 Official Japanese site

2004 video games
Action-adventure games
Video games developed in Japan
Virtua Fighter
GameCube games
PlayStation 2 games
Virtua Fighter